Cimoliasaurus was a plesiosaur that lived during the  Late Cretaceous (Maastrichtian) of New Jersey.

Etymology

Taxonomic history 

The name Cimoliasaurus magnus was coined by Joseph Leidy for ANSP 9235, one anterior and 12 posterior cervical vertebrae collected in Maastrichtian-aged greensand deposits in Burlington County, New Jersey.

In his catalogue of plesiosaur and ichthyosaur specimens preserved in the NHM, the British zoologist Richard Lydekker referred several Jurassic and Cretaceous plesiosaur species to Cimoliasaurus, including the new species C. richardsoni (now considered a species of Cryptoclidus) and C. cantabrigiensis, as well as Colymbosaurus and a number of previously described species from the Cambridge Greensand and Chalk Group.

Nowadays, Cimoliasaurus is now recognized as being a derived elasmosaurid, effectively making the family name Cimoliasauridae Delair, 1959 a junior synonym of Elasmosauridae.

Misassigned nominal species

 Cimoliasaurus laramiensis Knight, 1900, now Tatenectes
 Cimoliasaurus richardsoni Lydekker, 1889, now Cryptoclidus richardsoni
 Cimoliasaurus valdensis Lydekker, 1889, now Hastanectes
 Cimoliasaurus teplicensis Fritsch, 1906 (nomen dubium)

See also
 List of plesiosaur genera
 Timeline of plesiosaur research

References

External links
 https://web.archive.org/web/20080414142638/http://www.palaeos.com/Vertebrates/Units/220Lepidosauromorpha/220.820.html#Cimoliasaurus

Late Cretaceous plesiosaurs of North America
Elasmosaurids
Fossil taxa described in 1851
Taxa named by Joseph Leidy
Sauropterygian genera